Varmazyar (also Romanized as Varmazyār and Varmaziar) is a village in Baranduz Rural District, in the Central District of Urmia County, West Azerbaijan Province, Iran. At the 2006 census, its population was 292, in 53 families.

References 

Populated places in Urmia County